Spacecraft propulsion is any method used to accelerate spacecraft and artificial satellites. In-space propulsion exclusively deals with propulsion systems used in the vacuum of space and should not be confused with space launch or atmospheric entry. 

Several methods of pragmatic spacecraft propulsion have been developed each having its own drawbacks and advantages.  Most satellites have simple reliable chemical thrusters (often monopropellant rockets) or resistojet rockets for orbital station-keeping and some use momentum wheels for attitude control. Soviet bloc satellites have used electric propulsion for decades, and newer Western geo-orbiting spacecraft are starting to use them for north–south station-keeping and orbit raising. Interplanetary vehicles mostly use chemical rockets as well, although a few have used ion thrusters and Hall-effect thrusters (two different types of electric propulsion) to great success.

Hypothetical in-space propulsion technologies describe the propulsion technologies that could meet future space science and exploration needs. These propulsion technologies are intended to provide effective exploration of the Solar System and will permit mission designers to plan missions to "fly anytime, anywhere, and complete a host of science objectives at the destinations" and with greater reliability and safety. With a wide range of possible missions and candidate propulsion technologies, the question of which technologies are "best" for future missions is a difficult one. A portfolio of propulsion technologies should be developed to provide optimum solutions for a diverse set of missions and destinations.

Purpose and function
In-space propulsion begins where the upper stage of the launch vehicle leaves off; performing the functions of primary propulsion, reaction control, station keeping, precision pointing, and orbital maneuvering. The main engines used in space provide the primary propulsive force for orbit transfer, planetary trajectories and extra planetary landing and ascent. The reaction control and orbital maneuvering systems provide the propulsive force for orbit maintenance, position control, station keeping, and spacecraft attitude control.

When in space, the purpose of a propulsion system is to change the velocity, or v, of a spacecraft. Because this is more difficult for more massive spacecraft, designers generally discuss spacecraft performance in amount of change in momentum per unit of propellant consumed also called specific impulse. The higher the specific impulse, the better the efficiency. Ion propulsion engines have high specific impulse (~3000 s) and low thrust  whereas chemical rockets like monopropellant or bipropellant rocket engines have a low specific impulse (~300 s) but high thrust.

When launching a spacecraft from Earth, a propulsion method must overcome a higher gravitational pull to provide a positive net acceleration.
In orbit, any additional impulse, even very tiny, will result in a change in the orbit path.

1) Prograde/Retrogade (i.e. acceleration in the tangential/opposite in tangential direction) – Increases/Decreases altitude of orbit

2) Perpendicular to orbital plane – Changes orbital inclination

The rate of change of velocity is called acceleration, and the rate of change of momentum is called force.  To reach a given velocity, one can apply a small acceleration over a long period of time, or one can apply a large acceleration over a short time.  Similarly, one can achieve a given impulse with a large force over a short time or a small force over a long time.  This means that for manoeuvring in space, a propulsion method that produces tiny accelerations but runs for a long time can produce the same impulse as a propulsion method that produces large accelerations for a short time.  When launching from a planet, tiny accelerations cannot overcome the planet's gravitational pull and so cannot be used.

Earth's surface is situated fairly deep in a gravity well. The escape velocity required to get out of it is 11.2 kilometers/second. As human beings evolved in a gravitational field of 1 g (9.8 m/s²), an ideal propulsion system for human spaceflight would be one that provides a continuous acceleration of 1 g (though human bodies can tolerate much larger accelerations over short periods). The occupants of a rocket or spaceship having such a propulsion system would be free from all the ill effects of free fall, such as nausea, muscular weakness, reduced sense of taste, or leaching of calcium from their bones.

The law of conservation of momentum means that in order for a propulsion method to change the momentum of a space craft it must change the momentum of something else as well.  A few designs take advantage of things like magnetic fields or light pressure in order to change the spacecraft's momentum, but in free space the rocket must bring along some mass to accelerate away in order to push itself forward. Such mass is called reaction mass.

In order for a rocket to work, it needs two things: reaction mass and energy.  The impulse provided by launching a particle of reaction mass having mass m at velocity v is mv.  But this particle has kinetic energy mv²/2, which must come from somewhere. In a conventional solid, liquid, or hybrid rocket, the fuel is burned, providing the energy, and the reaction products are allowed to flow out the back, providing the reaction mass.  In an ion thruster, electricity is used to accelerate ions out the back. Here some other source must provide the electrical energy (perhaps a solar panel or a nuclear reactor), whereas the ions provide the reaction mass.

When discussing the efficiency of a propulsion system, designers often focus on effectively using the reaction mass.  Reaction mass must be carried along with the rocket and is irretrievably consumed when used.  One way of measuring the amount of impulse that can be obtained from a fixed amount of reaction mass is the specific impulse, the impulse per unit weight-on-Earth (typically designated by ). The unit for this value is seconds. Because the weight on Earth of the reaction mass is often unimportant when discussing vehicles in space, specific impulse can also be discussed in terms of impulse per unit mass.  This alternate form of specific impulse uses the same units as velocity (e.g. m/s), and in fact it is equal to the effective exhaust velocity of the engine (typically designated ).  Confusingly, both values are sometimes called specific impulse.  The two values differ by a factor of gn, the standard acceleration due to gravity 9.80665 m/s².

A rocket with a high exhaust velocity can achieve the same impulse with less reaction mass.  However, the energy required for that impulse is proportional to the exhaust velocity, so that more mass-efficient engines require much more energy, and are typically less energy efficient.  This is a problem if the engine is to provide a large amount of thrust.  To generate a large amount of impulse per second, it must use a large amount of energy per second.  So high-mass-efficient engines require enormous amounts of energy per second to produce high thrusts.  As a result, most high-mass-efficient engine designs also provide lower thrust due to the unavailability of high amounts of energy.

In-space propulsion represents technologies that can significantly improve a number of critical aspects of the mission. Space exploration is about getting somewhere safely (mission enabling), getting there quickly (reduced transit times), getting a lot of mass there (increased payload mass), and getting there cheaply (lower cost). The simple act of "getting" there requires the employment of an in-space propulsion system, and the other metrics are modifiers to this fundamental action.

Development of technologies will result in technical solutions that improve thrust levels, Isp, power, specific mass, (or specific power), volume, system mass, system complexity, operational complexity, commonality with other spacecraft systems, manufacturability, durability, and cost. These types of improvements will yield decreased transit times, increased payload mass, safer spacecraft, and decreased costs. In some instances, development of technologies within this technology area (TA) will result in mission-enabling breakthroughs that will revolutionize space exploration. There is no single propulsion technology that will benefit all missions or mission types. The requirements for in-space propulsion vary widely due according to their intended application. The described technologies should support everything from small satellites and robotic deep space exploration to space stations and human missions to Mars applications.

Defining technologies
Furthermore, the term "mission pull" defines a technology or a performance characteristic necessary to meet a planned NASA mission requirement. Any other relationship between a technology and a mission (an alternate propulsion system, for example) is categorized as "technology push." Also, a space demonstration refers to the spaceflight of a scaled version of a particular technology or of a critical technology subsystem. On the other hand, a space validation would serve as a qualification flight for future mission implementation. A successful validation flight would not require any additional space testing of a particular technology before it can be adopted for a science or exploration mission.

Operating domains
Spacecraft operate in many areas of space. These include orbital maneuvering, interplanetary travel and interstellar travel.

Orbital

Artificial satellites are first launched into the desired altitude by conventional liquid/solid propelled rockets after which the satellite may use onboard propulsion systems for orbital stationkeeping. Once in the desired orbit, they often need some form of attitude control so that they are correctly pointed with respect to the Earth, the Sun, and possibly some astronomical object of interest. They are also subject to drag from the thin atmosphere,  so that to stay in orbit for a long period of time some form of propulsion is occasionally necessary to make small corrections (orbital station-keeping). Many satellites need to be moved from one orbit to another from time to time, and this also requires propulsion. A satellite's useful life is usually over once it has exhausted its ability to adjust its orbit.

Interplanetary

For interplanetary travel, a spacecraft can use its engines to leave Earth's orbit. It is not explicitly necessary as the initial boost given by the rocket, gravity slingshot, monopropellant/bipropellent attitude control propulsion system are enough for the exploration of the solar system (see New Horizons). Once it has done so, it must somehow make its way to its destination.  Current interplanetary spacecraft do this with a series of short-term trajectory adjustments. In between these adjustments, the spacecraft simply moves along its trajectory without accelerating. The most fuel-efficient means to move from one circular orbit to another is with a Hohmann transfer orbit: the spacecraft begins in a roughly circular orbit around the Sun.  A short period of thrust in the direction of motion accelerates or decelerates the spacecraft into an elliptical orbit around the Sun which is tangential to its previous orbit and also to the orbit of its destination.  The spacecraft falls freely along this elliptical orbit until it reaches its destination, where another short period of thrust accelerates or decelerates it to match the orbit of its destination.  Special methods such as aerobraking or aerocapture are sometimes used for this final orbital adjustment.

Some spacecraft propulsion methods such as solar sails provide very low but inexhaustible thrust; an interplanetary vehicle using one of these methods would follow a rather different trajectory, either constantly thrusting against its direction of motion in order to decrease its distance from the Sun or constantly thrusting along its direction of motion to increase its distance from the Sun. The concept has been successfully tested by the Japanese IKAROS solar sail spacecraft.

Interstellar

No spacecraft capable of short duration (compared to human lifetime) interstellar travel has yet been built, but many hypothetical designs have been discussed. Because interstellar distances are very great, a tremendous velocity is needed to get a spacecraft to its destination in a reasonable amount of time.  Acquiring such a velocity on launch and getting rid of it on arrival remains a formidable challenge for spacecraft designers.

Propulsion technology
The technology areas are divided into four basic groups: (1) Chemical propulsion, (2) Electric propulsion, (3) Advanced propulsion technologies, and (4) Supporting technologies; based on the physics of the propulsion system and how it derives thrust as well as its technical maturity. Additionally, there may be credible meritorious in-space propulsion concepts not foreseen or reviewed at the time of publication, and which may be shown to be beneficial to future mission applications.

Chemical propulsion
A large fraction of the rocket engines in use today are chemical rockets; that is, they obtain the energy needed to generate thrust by chemical reactions to create a hot gas that is expanded to produce thrust. Many different propellant combinations are used to obtain these chemical reactions, including hydrazine, liquid oxygen, liquid hydrogen, nitrous oxide, and hydrogen peroxide for example. They can be used as a monopropellant or in a bi-propellant configuration.

Green chemical propulsion
The dominant form of chemical propulsion for satellites has historically been hydrazine, however this fuel is highly toxic and at risk of being banned across Europe. Non-toxic 'green' alternatives are now being developed to replace hydrazine. Nitrous oxide-based alternatives are garnering a lot of traction and government support, with development being led by commercial companies Dawn Aerospace, Impulse Space, and Launcher. The first nitrous oxide-based system ever flown in space was by D-Orbit onboard their ION Satellite Carrier (space tug) in 2021, using six Dawn Aerospace B20 thrusters, launched upon a Falcon 9 rocket.

Reaction engines

Reaction engines produce thrust by expelling reaction mass, in accordance with Newton's third law of motion. This law of motion is most commonly paraphrased as: "For every action force there is an equal, but opposite, reaction force."

Examples include jet engines, rocket engines, pump-jet, and more uncommon variations such as Hall–effect thrusters, ion drives, mass drivers, and nuclear pulse propulsion.

Rocket engines

Most rocket engines are internal combustion heat engines (although non combusting forms exist). Rocket engines generally produce a high temperature reaction mass, as a hot gas. This is achieved by combusting a solid, liquid or gaseous fuel with an oxidiser within a combustion chamber. The extremely hot gas is then allowed to escape through a high-expansion ratio nozzle. This bell-shaped nozzle is what gives a rocket engine its characteristic shape. The effect of the nozzle is to dramatically accelerate the mass, converting most of the thermal energy into kinetic energy. Exhaust speed reaching as high as 10 times the speed of sound at sea level are common.

Rocket engines provide essentially the highest specific powers and high specific thrusts of any engine used for spacecraft propulsion.

Ion propulsion rockets can heat a plasma or charged gas inside a magnetic bottle and release it via a magnetic nozzle, so that no solid matter need come in contact with the plasma.  Of course, the machinery to do this is complex, but research into nuclear fusion has developed methods, some of which have been proposed to be used in propulsion systems, and some have been tested in a lab.

See rocket engine for a listing of various kinds of rocket engines using different heating methods, including chemical, electrical, solar, and nuclear.

Electric propulsion

Electric propulsion is commonly used for station keeping on commercial communications satellites and for prime propulsion on some scientific space missions because of their high specific impulse. However, they generally have very small values of thrust and therefore must be operated for long durations to provide the total impulse required by a mission.

Rather than relying on high temperature and fluid dynamics to accelerate the reaction mass to high speeds, there are a variety of methods that use electrostatic or electromagnetic forces to accelerate the reaction mass directly.  Usually the reaction mass is a stream of ions.  Such an engine typically uses electric power, first to ionize atoms, and then to create a voltage gradient to accelerate the ions to high exhaust velocities.

The idea of electric propulsion dates back to 1906, when Robert Goddard considered the possibility in his personal notebook.
Konstantin Tsiolkovsky published the idea in 1911.

For these drives, at the highest exhaust speeds, energetic efficiency and thrust are all inversely proportional to exhaust velocity. Their very high exhaust velocity means they require huge amounts of energy and thus with practical power sources provide low thrust, but use hardly any fuel.

The Glenn Research Center aims to develop primary propulsion technologies which could benefit near and mid-term science missions by reducing cost, mass, and/or travel times. Propulsion architectures of particular interest to the GRC are electric propulsion systems, such as Ion and Hall thrusters.  One system combines solar sails, a form of propellantless propulsion which relies on naturally-occurring starlight for propulsion energy, and Hall thrusters. Other propulsion technologies being developed include advanced chemical propulsion and aerocapture.

For some missions, particularly reasonably close to the Sun, solar energy may be sufficient, and has very often been used, but for others further out or at higher power, nuclear energy is necessary; engines drawing their power from a nuclear source are called nuclear electric rockets.

With any current source of electrical power, chemical, nuclear or solar, the maximum amount of power that can be generated limits the amount of thrust that can be produced to a small value.  Power generation adds significant mass to the spacecraft, and ultimately the weight of the power source limits the performance of the vehicle.

Current nuclear power generators are approximately half the weight of solar panels per watt of energy supplied, at terrestrial distances from the Sun. Chemical power generators are not used due to the far lower total available energy. Beamed power to the spacecraft shows some potential.

Some electromagnetic methods:
 Ion thrusters (accelerate ions first and later neutralize the ion beam with an electron stream emitted from a cathode called a neutralizer)
Electrostatic ion thruster
Gridded ion thruster
Field-emission electric propulsion
MagBeam
Hall-effect thruster
Colloid thruster
 Electrothermal thrusters (electromagnetic fields are used to generate a plasma to increase the heat of the bulk propellant, the thermal energy imparted to the propellant gas is then converted into kinetic energy by a nozzle of either physical material construction or by magnetic means)
DC arcjet
Microwave arcjet
Helicon double-layer thruster
 Electromagnetic thrusters (ions are accelerated either by the Lorentz Force or by the effect of electromagnetic fields where the electric field is not in the direction of the acceleration)
Plasma propulsion engine
Magnetoplasmadynamic thruster
Electrodeless plasma thruster
Pulsed inductive thruster
Pulsed plasma thruster
Variable specific impulse magnetoplasma rocket (VASIMR)
Vacuum arc thruster
Mass drivers (for propulsion)

In electrothermal and electromagnetic thrusters, both ions and electrons are accelerated simultaneously, no neutralizer is required.

Without internal reaction mass 

The law of conservation of momentum is usually taken to imply that any engine which uses no reaction mass cannot accelerate the center of mass of a spaceship (changing orientation, on the other hand, is possible). But space is not empty, especially space inside the Solar System; there are gravitation fields, magnetic fields, electromagnetic waves, solar wind and solar radiation.  Electromagnetic waves in particular are known to contain momentum, despite being massless; specifically the momentum flux density P of an EM wave is quantitatively 1/c2 times the Poynting vector S, i.e. P = S/c2, where c is the velocity of light. Field propulsion methods which do not rely on reaction mass thus must try to take advantage of this fact by coupling to a momentum-bearing field such as an EM wave that exists in the vicinity of the craft. However, because many of these phenomena are diffuse in nature, corresponding propulsion structures need to be proportionately large.

There are several different space drives that need little or no reaction mass to function. A tether propulsion system employs a long cable with a high tensile strength to change a spacecraft's orbit, such as by interaction with a planet's magnetic field or through momentum exchange with another object. Solar sails rely on radiation pressure from electromagnetic energy, but they require a large collection surface to function effectively. 

A magnetic sail deflects charged particles from the solar wind with a magnetic field, thereby imparting momentum to the spacecraft. The Magsail is a large superconducting loop proposed for acceleration/deceleration in the solar wind and deceleration in the Interstellar medium. A variant is the mini-magnetospheric plasma propulsion system and its successor, the Magnetoplasma sail inject plasma at a low rate to enhance the magnetic field to more effectively deflect charged particles in a plasma wind. 

An E-sail would use very thin and lightweight wires holding an electric charge to deflect these particles, and may have more controllable directionality.

As a proof of concept, NanoSail-D became the first nanosatellite to orbit Earth. As of August 2017, NASA confirmed the Sunjammer solar sail project was concluded in 2014 with lessons learned for future space sail projects.
Cubesail will be the first mission to demonstrate solar sailing in low Earth orbit, and the first mission to demonstrate full three-axis attitude control of a solar sail.

Japan also launched its own solar sail powered spacecraft IKAROS in May 2010. IKAROS successfully demonstrated propulsion and guidance and is still flying today.

A satellite or other space vehicle is subject to the law of conservation of angular momentum, which constrains a body from a net change in angular velocity. Thus, for a vehicle to change its relative orientation without expending reaction mass, another part of the vehicle may rotate in the opposite direction.  Non-conservative external forces, primarily gravitational and atmospheric, can contribute up to several degrees per day to angular momentum, so secondary systems are designed to "bleed off" undesired rotational energies built up over time. Accordingly, many spacecraft utilize reaction wheels or control moment gyroscopes to control orientation in space.

A gravitational slingshot can carry a space probe onward to other destinations without the expense of reaction mass. By harnessing the gravitational energy of other celestial objects, the spacecraft can pick up kinetic energy. However, even more energy can be obtained from the gravity assist if rockets are used.

Beam-powered propulsion is another method of propulsion without reaction mass.  Beamed propulsion includes sails pushed by laser, microwave, or particle beams.

Advanced propulsion technology
Advanced, and in some cases theoretical, propulsion technologies may use chemical or nonchemical physics to produce thrust, but are generally considered to be of lower technical maturity with challenges that have not been overcome.  For both human and robotic exploration, traversing the solar system is a struggle against time and distance. The most distant planets are 4.5–6 billion kilometers from the Sun and to reach them in any reasonable time requires much more capable propulsion systems than conventional chemical rockets. Rapid inner solar system missions with flexible launch dates are difficult, requiring propulsion systems that are beyond today's current state of the art. The logistics, and therefore the total system mass required to support sustained human exploration beyond Earth to destinations such as the Moon, Mars or Near Earth Objects,
are daunting unless more efficient in-space propulsion technologies are developed and fielded.

A variety of hypothetical propulsion techniques have been considered that require a deeper understanding of the properties of 
space, particularly inertial frames and the vacuum state.  To date, such methods are highly speculative and include:

Black hole starship
Differential sail
Gravitational shielding
Field propulsion
Diametric drive
Disjunction drive
Pitch drive
Bias drive
Photon rocket
Quantum vacuum thruster
Nano electrokinetic thruster
Reactionless drive
Abraham—Minkowski drive
Alcubierre drive
Dean drive
EmDrive
Heim theory
Woodward effect
Thornson Inertial Engine (TIE)
Gyroscopic Inertial Thruster (GIT)

A NASA assessment of its Breakthrough Propulsion Physics Program divides such proposals into those that are non-viable for propulsion purposes, those that are of uncertain potential, and those that are not impossible according to current theories.

Table of methods
Below is a summary of some of the more popular, proven technologies, followed by increasingly speculative methods.

Four numbers are shown.  The first is the effective exhaust velocity: the equivalent speed that the propellant leaves the vehicle.  This is not necessarily the most important characteristic of the propulsion method; thrust and power consumption and other factors can be. However:
 if the delta-v is much more than the exhaust velocity, then exorbitant amounts of fuel are necessary (see the section on calculations, above)
 if it is much more than the delta-v, then, proportionally more energy is needed; if the power is limited, as with solar energy, this means that the journey takes a proportionally longer time

The second and third are the typical amounts of thrust and the typical burn times of the method.  Outside a gravitational potential small amounts of thrust applied over a long period will give the same effect as large amounts of thrust over a short period. (This result does not apply when the object is significantly influenced by gravity.)

The fourth is the maximum delta-v this technique can give (without staging). For rocket-like propulsion systems this is a function of mass fraction and exhaust velocity. Mass fraction for rocket-like systems is usually limited by propulsion system weight and tankage weight. For a system to achieve this limit, typically the payload may need to be a negligible percentage of the vehicle, and so the practical limit on some systems can be much lower.

Table Notes

Testing
Spacecraft propulsion systems are often first statically tested on Earth's surface, within the atmosphere but many systems require a vacuum chamber to test fully. Rockets are usually tested at a rocket engine test facility well away from habitation and other buildings for safety reasons. Ion drives are far less dangerous and require much less stringent safety, usually only a large-ish vacuum chamber is needed.

Famous static test locations can be found at Rocket Ground Test Facilities

Some systems cannot be adequately tested on the ground and test launches may be employed at a Rocket Launch Site.

Planetary and atmospheric propulsion

Launch-assist mechanisms

There have been many ideas proposed for launch-assist mechanisms that have the potential of drastically reducing the cost of getting into orbit. Proposed non-rocket spacelaunch launch-assist mechanisms include:

Skyhook (requires reusable suborbital launch vehicle, not feasible using presently available materials)
Space elevator (tether from Earth's surface to geostationary orbit, cannot be built with existing materials)
Launch loop (a very fast enclosed rotating loop about 80 km tall)
Space fountain (a very tall building held up by a stream of masses fired from its base)
Orbital ring (a ring around Earth with spokes hanging down off bearings)
Electromagnetic catapult (railgun, coilgun) (an electric gun)
Rocket sled launch
Space gun (Project HARP, ram accelerator) (a chemically powered gun)
Beam-powered propulsion rockets and jets powered from the ground via a beam
High-altitude platforms to assist initial stage

Air-breathing engines

Studies generally show that conventional air-breathing engines, such as ramjets or turbojets are basically too heavy (have too low a thrust/weight ratio) to give any significant performance improvement when installed on a launch vehicle itself. However, launch vehicles can be air launched from separate lift vehicles (e.g. B-29, Pegasus Rocket and White Knight) which do use such propulsion systems.  Jet engines mounted on a launch rail could also be so used.

On the other hand, very lightweight or very high speed engines have been proposed that take advantage of the air during ascent:
 SABRE – a lightweight hydrogen fuelled turbojet with precooler
 ATREX – a lightweight hydrogen fuelled turbojet with precooler
 Liquid air cycle engine – a hydrogen fuelled jet engine that liquifies the air before burning it in a rocket engine
 Scramjet – jet engines that use supersonic combustion
 Shcramjet – similar to a scramjet engine, however it takes advantage of shockwaves produced from the aircraft in the combustion chamber to assist in increasing overall efficiency.

Normal rocket launch vehicles fly almost vertically before rolling over at an altitude of some tens of kilometers before burning sideways for orbit; this initial vertical climb wastes propellant but is optimal as it greatly reduces airdrag. Airbreathing engines burn propellant much more efficiently and this would permit a far flatter launch trajectory, the vehicles would typically fly approximately tangentially to Earth's surface until leaving the atmosphere then perform a rocket burn to bridge the final delta-v to orbital velocity.

For spacecraft already in very low-orbit, air-breathing electric propulsion would use residual gases in the upper atmosphere as propellant. Air-breathing electric propulsion could make a new class of long-lived, low-orbiting missions feasible on Earth, Mars or Venus.

Planetary arrival and landing

When a vehicle is to enter orbit around its destination planet, or when it is to land, it must adjust its velocity.  This can be done using all the methods listed above (provided they can generate a high enough thrust), but there are a few methods that can take advantage of planetary atmospheres and/or surfaces.

 Aerobraking allows a spacecraft to reduce the high point of an elliptical orbit by repeated brushes with the atmosphere at the low point of the orbit. This can save a considerable amount of fuel because it takes much less delta-V to enter an elliptical orbit compared to a low circular orbit. Because the braking is done over the course of many orbits, heating is comparatively minor, and a heat shield is not required. This has been done on several Mars missions such as Mars Global Surveyor, 2001 Mars Odyssey, and Mars Reconnaissance Orbiter, and at least one Venus mission, Magellan.
 Aerocapture is a much more aggressive manoeuver, converting an incoming hyperbolic orbit to an elliptical orbit in one pass.  This requires a heat shield and much trickier navigation, because it must be completed in one pass through the atmosphere, and unlike aerobraking no preview of the atmosphere is possible. If the intent is to remain in orbit, then at least one more propulsive maneuver is required after aerocapture—otherwise the low point of the resulting orbit will remain in the atmosphere, resulting in eventual re-entry. Aerocapture has not yet been tried on a planetary mission, but the re-entry skip by Zond 6 and Zond 7 upon lunar return were aerocapture maneuvers, because they turned a hyperbolic orbit into an elliptical orbit. On these missions, because there was no attempt to raise the perigee after the aerocapture, the resulting orbit still intersected the atmosphere, and re-entry occurred at the next perigee.
 A ballute is an inflatable drag device.
 Parachutes can land a probe on a planet or moon with an atmosphere, usually after the atmosphere has scrubbed off most of the velocity, using a heat shield.
 Airbags can soften the final landing.
 Lithobraking, or stopping by impacting the surface, is usually done by accident. However, it may be done deliberately with the probe expected to survive (see, for example, Deep Impact (spacecraft)), in which case very sturdy probes are required.

In fiction

In science fiction, space ships use various means to travel, some of them scientifically plausible (like solar sails or ramjets), others, mostly or entirely fictitious (like anti-gravity, warp drive, spindizzy or hyperspace travel).

See also

References

External links
 NASA Breakthrough Propulsion Physics project
 Different Rockets 
 Earth-to-Orbit Transportation Bibliography 
 Spaceflight Propulsion – a detailed survey by Greg Goebel, in the public domain
 Johns Hopkins University, Chemical Propulsion Information Analysis Center
 Tool for Liquid Rocket Engine Thermodynamic Analysis
 Smithsonian National Air and Space Museum's How Things Fly website
 Fullerton, Richard K. "Advanced EVA Roadmaps and Requirements." Proceedings of the 31st International Conference on Environmental Systems. 2001.
 Atomic Rocket – Engines: A site listing and detailing real, theoretical and fantasy space engines.

Spacecraft propulsion
Spacecraft components
Spaceflight technology
NASA programs
Glenn Research Center
Discovery and exploration of the Solar System